CMX521 is an antiviral drug discovered by Chimerix, which was developed for the treatment of norovirus, though it also shows efficacy against related viral diarrheas such as rotovirus and some sapoviruses, astroviruses and adenoviruses. It is a nucleoside analogue which acts as an inhibitor of viral RNA-dependant RNA polymerase.

See also 
 GS-441524
 NITD008
 Sangivamycin

References 

Anti–RNA virus drugs
Antiviral drugs